Piccaninny, with variant spellings Pickaninny, Piccaninnie, Picaninny and Pickaninnie, Piccininni may refer to:

 Pickaninny, derogatory term for a black child
 Piccaninny crater, impact structure in Western Australia
 Pickaninny Buttes, summit in California
 Piccaninny tribe, fictional Native American tribe in the children's novel Peter and Wendy
 Pickaninny, a type of chess problem

See also
 Piccaninny Plains Sanctuary, nature reserve in Queensland, Australia
 Piccaninnie Ponds Conservation Park, South Australia